Robert Charles Gardiner (born 22 March 1936) is an Australian former racewalker who competed in the 1964 Summer Olympics and in the 1968 Summer Olympics.

References

1936 births
Living people
Australian male racewalkers
Olympic athletes of Australia
Athletes (track and field) at the 1964 Summer Olympics
Athletes (track and field) at the 1968 Summer Olympics
Commonwealth Games medallists in athletics
Commonwealth Games silver medallists for Australia
Athletes (track and field) at the 1970 British Commonwealth Games
20th-century Australian people
21st-century Australian people
Medallists at the 1970 British Commonwealth Games